Luveve Secondary School is a government school in Bulawayo, Zimbabwe. It was established in January 1958 as a technical college for black students, but became a secondary school in 1965 for black students as the technical college was closed due to Rhodesia's Unilateral Declaration of Independence. Initially the school was open to only male students and had an initial enrollment of 45 students in 1958.

It was built to train black Africans in technical trades with a view to them returning to their homelands to teach their peers the trades that they had learned. At that time only the staff were multi-racial, the majority being white, some local, but many brought in on special contracts from the UK.

The main trades taught were: Brickwork, Plastering, Painting and Decorating, Carpentry and Joinery, Motor Engineering, Electrical, Plumbing, Engineering (Machining).

References 

Schools in Zimbabwe

Educational institutions established in 1958